{{Infobox martial artist
| name            = Mac Danzig
| image           = Mac Danzig.jpg
| image_size      = 200px
| alt             =
| caption         =
| birth_name      =
| birth_date      = 
| birth_place     = Cleveland, Ohio, U.S.
| residence       = Bend, Oregon, U.S.
| nationality     = American
| height          = 
| weight          = 
| weight_class    = LightweightWelterweight
| reach           = 
| style           = 
| stance          = Orthodox
| rank            =  Black Belt in Brazilian Jiu-Jitsu| fighting_out_of = Los Angeles, California, U.S.
| team            = 
| years_active    = 2001–20142017
| mma_kowin       = 5
| mma_subwin      = 11
| mma_decwin      = 6
| mma_koloss      = 2
| mma_subloss     = 2
| mma_decloss     = 8
| mma_draw        = 1
| mma_nc          =
| am_win          = 5
| am_kowin        = 
| am_subwin       = 4
| am_decwin       = 1
| am_loss         = 1
| am_koloss       = 
| am_subloss      = 
| am_decloss      = 1
| am_draw         = 
| am_nc           =
| box_loss        = 1
| box_koloss      = 1
| url             =
| sherdog         = 3396
| boxrec          = 298881
| footnotes       =
| updated         =
}}

Mac Danzig (born January 2, 1980) is an American mixed martial artist, who competed as a lightweight in several MMA promotions, most notably the Ultimate Fighting Championship. He was the winner of The Ultimate Fighter season six.

Background
Danzig, of German and Scots-Irish descent, grew up in the greater Pittsburgh area before moving to Los Angeles to pursue his career.

Mixed martial arts career
In the past, Danzig was known for his association with R1 fight team (formerly RAW) and had been a student of Iowa wrestling standout Rico Chiapparelli and MMA fighter Frank Trigg.  Since then he trained boxing extensively at both the Wild Card gym in Hollywood, California under Freddie Roach assistant Justin Fortune, and also Gil Martinez in Las Vegas, Nevada during his time on the Extreme Couture MMA Team.

While Danzig is known as an impressive grappler, having scored 12 of his victories by submission; he has proven himself to be an adept striker, most notably with his KO victory over Joe Stevenson and his TKO victory over former lightweight champion Takumi Nakayama.

After defeating Royce Gracie black belt Buddy Clinton on August 4, 2006, Danzig increased his winning streak to 12 in a row with a unanimous decision victory over Miletich fighter John Mahlow on September 29 in Calgary, Alberta Canada.

Danzig then lost his KOTC title to Clay French on January 19, 2007, by split decision.

In his first major fight, facing Hayato Sakurai  at PRIDE 33 on February 24, Danzig lost the fight by KO (punch)  at the 4:01 mark of round two.

The Ultimate Fighter
Mac was a contestant on The Ultimate Fighter 6, Danzig defeated Joe Scarola in a preliminary fight and later defeated John Kolosci to make it to the semifinals. 
He then defeated Kolosci (who had replaced an injured Matt Arroyo) again, and moved on to the finals where he submitted Tom Speer in the 1st round to become TUF Season 6 winner.

Ultimate Fighting Championship
Danzig made his official UFC debut on December 8, 2007, where he won The Ultimate Fighter 6, defeating Tom Speer in the finals via rear naked choke at 2:01 of the first round. Before the fight, Danzig stated his intention to drop down in weight class to lightweight whether he won or lost, citing the size difference between himself and most of the other UFC welterweights.

Danzig made his return to lightweight by defeating Canadian Mark Bocek via third round submission at UFC 83 on April 19, 2008.

On September 17, 2008, at UFC Fight Night, Danzig lost a unanimous decision to Clay Guida, who used his wrestling to control Danzig. Danzig gave Guida some problems on the feet in the first round displaying crisp striking skills. In the second and third rounds though, Danzig succumbed to Guida's wrestling offense, as his opponent controlled him for with takedowns and top control.

At UFC Fight Night 17 he lost via triangle choke to Josh Neer. Both Danzig and Neer received Fight of the Night honors. The loss dropped Danzig to 1–2 in his post-TUF career. The two fighters exchanged on the feet quite evenly in a back and forth fight, but Neer's active guard caused Danzig problems as he was caught in the fight ending submission after getting on top following a scramble in the second round.

Danzig lost to Jim Miller at UFC 100 on July 11, 2009, at the Mandalay Bay in Las Vegas via unanimous decision (30-27, 30-27, 30-27) making it his third consecutive loss in the UFC.

Danzig defeated Justin Buchholz on February 6, 2010, at UFC 109 by unanimous decision with all three judges scoring it 29–28 for Danzig, snapping his three-fight losing streak.

Danzig was defeated by Matt Wiman via first round technical submission at UFC 115. The stoppage was considered controversial by many as Wiman had Danzig in a guillotine choke, and referee Yves Lavigne called a stoppage despite the fact that Danzig had not submitted and was still conscious.

Danzig was expected to face Wiman again on September 15, 2010, at UFC Fight Night 22, but pulled out of the fight due to a chest injury sustained during training.

Danzig then faced Joe Stevenson (season 2 Ultimate Fighter winner) on December 11, 2010, at UFC 124 and earned his first KO victory in the UFC at 1:54 of the first round. While moving backwards, Danzig landed a counter-left hook that sent Stevenson to the ground, and Danzig was subsequently awarded the Knockout of the Night bonus.

Danzig was expected to face Donald Cerrone on June 11, 2011, at UFC 131 but had to withdraw due to a chest injury.

A rematch with Matt Wiman took place on October 1, 2011, at UFC on Versus 6 with Danzig losing via unanimous decision in a bout that earned Fight of the Night honors.

Danzig faced Efrain Escudero (season 8 Ultimate Fighter winner) on April 21, 2012, at UFC 145. He defeated Escudero by unanimous decision.

Danzig faced Takanori Gomi on November 10, 2012, at UFC on Fuel TV 6, with Danzig losing in a split decision.

Danzig next fought Melvin Guillard on July 27, 2013, at UFC on Fox 8. After a close first round, Danzig lost via knockout in the second round.

Danzig faced Joe Lauzon on December 14, 2013, at UFC on Fox 9. He lost the fight via unanimous decision.

After his loss to Lauzon, Danzig announced his retirement from MMA fighting on March 4, 2014. This concludes his overall record of 5-8 with the UFC. Danzig stated he retired due to concussions and accumulated brain damage.

On January 10, 2015, Danzig was awarded his Black Belt in Brazilian Jiu-Jitsu by Andy Wang and Baret Yoshida.

Return
On June 17, 2017, it was announced that Danzig would make his MMA return on August 5, 2017, to face WSOF vet Joe Condon for the CFL Junior Welterweight Championship. He won via rear naked choke in the third round to become the CFL Junior Welterweight Champion.

Personal life
Danzig had a daughter, Nova, in November 2008.

He has been a vegan since 2004 and is an animal rights advocate.

Danzig is credited as a Mixed Martial Arts Consultant for the Nickelodeon television series The Legend of Korra.''

Mac is a semi-professional nature photographer who specializes in landscape and wildlife photography.

In 2015 he married fellow MMA fighter Angela Hancock (now Angela Danzig) whom he coaches and trains.  Together, they live in Bend, OR with 2 children.

Danzig appears as himself in the 2011 documentary Forks Over Knives.

Danzig also appeared as a guest on Joe Rogan's podcast The Joe Rogan Experience in 2012.

In June 2018, Danzig announced via his Instagram page that he and his wife would be moving from Los Angeles and opening their own MMA facility known as Danzig MMA in Bend, Oregon.

Championships and accomplishments
California Fight League
CFL Junior Welterweight Championship (One time)
Extreme Challenge Trials
 2001 Extreme Trials Eastern Regional Champion
 2001 Extreme Trials National Champion
Gladiator Challenge
GC Lightweight World Championship (One time)
International Fighting Championship
IFC Mayhem In Montana Tournament Winner
King of the Cage
 King of the Cage Lightweight World Championship (One time)
 Four successful title defenses
Ultimate Fighting Championship
 Ultimate Fighter 6 Winner
 Fight of the Night (Three times)
 Knockout of the Night (One time)

Mixed martial arts record

|-
| Win
| align=center| 22–12–1
| Joe Condon
| Submission (rear-naked choke)
| CFL 11
| 
| align=center| 3
| align=center| 2:49
| Victorville, California, United States
| 
|-
| Loss
| align=center| 21–12–1
| Joe Lauzon
| Decision (unanimous)
| UFC on Fox: Johnson vs. Benavidez 2
| 
| align=center| 3
| align=center| 5:00
| Sacramento, California, United States
| 
|-
| Loss
| align=center| 21–11–1
| Melvin Guillard
| KO (punches)
| UFC on Fox: Johnson vs. Moraga
| 
| align=center| 2
| align=center| 2:47
| Seattle, Washington, United States
| 
|-
| Loss
| align=center| 21–10–1
| Takanori Gomi
| Decision (split)
| UFC on Fuel TV: Franklin vs. Le
| 
| align=center| 3
| align=center| 5:00
| Macau, SAR, China
| 
|-
| Win
| align=center| 21–9–1
| Efrain Escudero
| Decision (unanimous)
| UFC 145
| 
| align=center| 3
| align=center| 5:00
| Atlanta, Georgia, United States
| 
|-
| Loss
| align=center| 20–9–1
| Matt Wiman
| Decision (unanimous)
| UFC Live: Cruz vs. Johnson
| 
| align=center| 3
| align=center| 5:00
| Washington D.C., United States
| 
|-
| Win
| align=center| 20–8–1
| Joe Stevenson
| KO (punch)
| UFC 124
| 
| align=center| 1
| align=center| 1:54
| Montreal, Quebec, Canada
| 
|-
| Loss
| align=center| 19–8–1
| Matt Wiman
| Technical submission (guillotine choke)
| UFC 115
| 
| align=center| 1
| align=center| 1:45
| Vancouver, British Columbia, Canada
| 
|-
| Win
| align=center| 19–7–1
| Justin Buchholz
| Decision (unanimous)
| UFC 109
| 
| align=center| 3
| align=center| 5:00
| Las Vegas, Nevada, United States
| 
|-
|  Loss
| align=center| 18–7–1
| Jim Miller
| Decision (unanimous)
| UFC 100
| 
| align=center| 3
| align=center| 5:00
| Las Vegas, Nevada, United States
| 
|-
| Loss
| align=center| 18–6–1
| Josh Neer
| Submission (triangle choke)
| UFC Fight Night: Lauzon vs. Stephens
| 
| align=center| 2
| align=center| 3:36
| Tampa, Florida, United States
| 
|-
| Loss
| align=center| 18–5–1
| Clay Guida
| Decision (unanimous)
| UFC Fight Night: Diaz vs. Neer
| 
| align=center| 3
| align=center| 5:00
| Omaha, Nebraska, United States
| 
|-
| Win
| align=center| 18–4–1
| Mark Bocek
| Submission (rear-naked choke)
| UFC 83
| 
| align=center| 3
| align=center| 3:48
| Montreal, Quebec, Canada
| 
|-
| Win
| align=center| 17–4–1
| Tom Speer
| Submission (rear-naked choke)
| The Ultimate Fighter: Team Hughes vs. Team Serra Finale
| 
| align=center| 1
| align=center| 2:01
| Las Vegas, Nevada, United States
| 
|-
| Loss
| align=center| 16–4–1
| Hayato Sakurai
| KO (punch)
| Pride 33
| 
| align=center| 2
| align=center| 4:01
| Las Vegas, Nevada, United States
| 
|-
| Loss
| align=center| 16–3–1
| Clay French
| Decision (split)
| KOTC: Hard Knocks
| 
| align=center| 3
| align=center| 5:00
| Rockford, Illinois, United States
| 
|-
| Win
| align=center| 16–2–1
| John Mahlow
| Decision (unanimous)
| KOTC: Detonator
| 
| align=center| 3
| align=center| 5:00
| Calgary, Alberta, Canada
| 
|-
| Win
| align=center| 15–2–1
| Buddy Clinton
| Decision (unanimous)
| KOTC: Rapid Fire
| 
| align=center| 3
| align=center| 5:00
| San Jacinto, California, United States
| 
|-
| Win
| align=center| 14–2–1
| Orlando Sanchez (BJJ)
| TKO (punches)
| KOTC: Karnage
| 
| align=center| 1
| align=center| 3:08
| Calgary, Alberta, Canada
| 
|-
| Win
| align=center| 13–2–1
| Jason Ireland
| Decision (unanimous)
| KOTC: Drop Zone
| 
| align=center| 3
| align=center| 5:00
| Mt. Pleasant, Michigan, United States
| 
|-
| Win
| align=center| 12–2–1
| Takumi Nakayama
| TKO (corner stoppage)
| KOTC: Execution Day
| 
| align=center| 3
| align=center| 2:45
| Reno, Nevada, United States
| 
|-
| Win
| align=center| 11–2–1
| Frank Kirmse
| Submission (rear-naked choke)
| KOTC: Shock and Awe
| 
| align=center| 1
| align=center| 1:45
| Edmonton, Alberta, Canada
| 
|-
| Win
| align=center| 10–2–1
| Nick Ertl
| TKO (doctor stoppage)
| GC 42: Summer Slam
| 
| align=center| 1
| align=center| 4:14
| Lakeport, California, United States
| 
|-
| Win
| align=center| 9–2–1
| Mike Valdez
| Submission (rear-naked choke)
| KOTC 54: Mucho Machismo
| 
| align=center| 1
| align=center| 4:13
| San Jacinto, California, United States
| 
|-
| Win
| align=center| 8–2–1
| Luke Spencer
| Submission (rear-naked choke)
| IFC: Caged Combat
| 
| align=center| 1
| align=center| 1:56
| Columbus, Ohio, United States
| 
|-
| Win
| align=center| 7–2–1
| Max Marin
| Submission (triangle choke)
| IFC: Mayhem in Montana
| 
| align=center| 1
| align=center| 3:39
| Billings, Montana, United States
| 
|-
| Win
| align=center| 6–2–1
| Brandon Olsen
| Submission (rear-naked choke)
| IFC: Mayhem in Montana
| 
| align=center| 2
| align=center| 2:12
| Billings, Montana, United States
| 
|-
| Win
| align=center| 5–2–1
| Akbarh Arreola
| TKO (punches)
| RM 5: Road to the Championship
| 
| align=center| 1
| align=center| 1:22
| Tijuana, Mexico
| 
|-
| Draw
| align=center| 4–2–1
| Jason Von Flue
| Draw
| Gladiator Challenge 25
| 
| align=center| 2
| align=center| 5:00
| Porterville, California, United States
| 
|-
| Loss
| align=center| 4–2
| LaVerne Clark
| Decision (unanimous)
| Extreme Challenge 54
| 
| align=center| 3
| align=center| 3:00
| Lakemoor, Illinois, United States
| 
|-
| Win
| align=center| 4–1
| Tripstin Kersiano
| Submission (rear-naked choke)
| Gladiator Challenge 14
| 
| align=center| 2
| align=center| 1:49
| Porterville, California, United States
| 
|-
| Loss
| align=center| 3–1
| Kurt Pellegrino
| Decision (unanimous)
| WEC 4
| 
| align=center| 3
| align=center| 5:00
| Uncasville, Connecticut, United States
| 
|-
| Win
| align=center| 3–0
| Brandon Bledsoe
| Submission (rear-naked choke)
| Gladiator Challenge 10
| 
| align=center| 1
| align=center| 0:56
| Colusa, California, United States
| 
|-
| Win
| align=center| 2–0
| Ray Totorico
| Submission (omoplata)
| Reality Combat Fighting 12
| 
| align=center| 1
| align=center| 1:30
| Houma, Louisiana, United States
| 
|-
| Win
| align=center| 1–0
| Cedric Stewart
| Decision (split)
| Extreme Challenge Trials
| 
| align=center| 3
| align=center| 5:00
| Decatur, Illinois, United States
|

Mixed martial arts exhibition record

|-
|Win
|align=center|3–0
|John Kolosci
|Submission (rear-naked choke)
|The Ultimate Fighter: Team Hughes vs Team Serra
|align='left'|
| style="text-align:center;"|1
| style="text-align:center;"|4:29
|align='left'| Las Vegas, Nevada, United States
| style="text-align:center;"|
|-
|Win
|align=center|2–0
|align='left'|John Kolosci
|align='left'|Submission (rear-naked choke)
|align='left'|The Ultimate Fighter: Team Hughes vs Team Serra
|align='left'|
| style="text-align:center;"|1
| style="text-align:center;"|3:57
|align='left'| Las Vegas, Nevada, United States
| style="text-align:center;"|
|-
|Win
|align=center|1–0
|align='left'|Joe Scarola
|Submission (triangle  choke)
|align='left'|The Ultimate Fighter: Team Hughes vs Team Serra
|align='left'|
| style="text-align:center;"|1
| style="text-align:center;"|4:55
|align='left'| Las Vegas, Nevada, United States
| style="text-align:center;"|
|-

Amateur mixed martial arts record

|-
| Win
|align=center| 5-1
|Joe Jordan
|Decision (unanimous)
|ECT: 2001 US National Championships
|January 5, 2002
|align=center|2
|align=center|5:00
|Davenport, Iowa, United States
|Became Extreme Trials 2001 National Lightweight MMA Champion.
|-
|  Win
|align=center| 4-1
|Tim Hernandez
|Submission (arm bar)
|ECT: 2001 US National Championships
|January 5, 2002
|align=center|3
|align=center|1:20
|Davenport, Iowa, United States
|
|-
| Win
|align=center| 3–1
|Jason Halderman
|Submission (arm bar)
|EC: Extreme Challenge Trials
|August 25, 2001
|align=center|1
|align=center|2:42
|Great Falls, Montana, United States
|Won EC Regional Amateur Championship.
|-
| Win
|align=center| 2–1
|Michael Rooney
|Submission (heel hook)
|EC: Extreme Challenge Trials
|August 25, 2001
|align=center|1
|align=center|1:06
|Cincinnati, Ohio, United States
|
|-
| Win
|align=center|1–1
|Kurt Kindred
|Submission (calf-slicer)
|EC: Extreme Challenge Trials
|August 25, 2001
|align=center|2
|align=center|4:51
|Cincinnati, Ohio, United States
|
|-
| Loss
|align=center| 0-1
|Kurt Pellegrino
|TKO (doctor stoppage - cut)
|MD2: Mass Destruction 2
|June 23, 2001
|align=center|1
|align=center|5:06
|Springfield, Massachusetts, United States
|
|-

Professional boxing record 

{|class="wikitable" style="text-align:center; font-size:95%"
|-
!
!Result
!Record
!Opponent
!Method
!Round, time
!Date
!Location
!Notes
|- 
|1
|Loss
|0–1
|align=left| Nick Brooks
|KO
| 1 (4)
|Feb 18, 2005
|align=left|
|

See also
List of vegans

References

External links

Official Twitter account
Official UFC Profile
Mac Danzig Diet

1980 births
Living people
The Ultimate Fighter winners
American practitioners of Brazilian jiu-jitsu
People awarded a black belt in Brazilian jiu-jitsu
American male mixed martial artists
Lightweight mixed martial artists
Mixed martial artists utilizing boxing
Mixed martial artists utilizing Brazilian jiu-jitsu
Mixed martial artists from Pennsylvania
American people of German descent
American people of Scotch-Irish descent
Ultimate Fighting Championship male fighters
American male boxers